Victoria Scott (born 1982) is an American writer of young adult fiction novels. She's the author of Titans  and the Fire & Flood series published by Scholastic Press, as well as the Dante Walker trilogy published by Entangled Teen. Scott's novels have been bought and translated in eleven foreign markets.

Early life and career
Scott was born in New Braunfels, Texas and currently resides in Dallas, Texas with her husband and daughter. In 2018, Scott founded Scribbler, a subscription box service for writers/novelists with Lindsay Cummings.

Reception

Titans received a starred review in Publishers Weekly. Salt & Stone, received a starred review by Kirkus Reviews, and the first book in the series, Fire & Flood, has been nominated as a YALSA Teens' Top 10 book for 2015.

Publications

Dante Walker Trilogy

 The Collector (2013)
 The Liberator (2013)
 The Warrior (2014)

Fire & Flood series

 Fire & Flood (2014)
 Salt & Stone (2015)

Standalone novels

 Titans (2016)
 Violet Grenade (2017)
 Hear the Wolves (2017) <small>

References

External links

 
 

Living people
American women novelists
American writers of young adult literature
Women writers of young adult literature
People from New Braunfels, Texas
Novelists from Texas
1982 births
21st-century American women